Neil Thomas Ministries (NTM) is a non-profit, Christian organization whose doctrine is heavily based on Methodism, a branch of Protestant Christianity. In 1971, Neil Thomas and Tom Griffiths founded the organization's college in Canberra, Australia 1976. As of 2011, NTM operates missions in Vanuatu, Solomon Islands, together with other nations in Africa and Oceania including New Caledonia, the Solomon Islands, where the ministry has been highly influential. In Vanuatu the ministry serves its community through three Bible Colleges in English and Bislama, 130 churches, two junior secondary schools and several medical clinics.

The founder of the denomination, Pastor Neil Thomas, died on 11 December 2014 in Melbourne, Australia. Since his death, Thomas has been the subject of allegations of sexual abuse and financial misdoings by former employees and church members.

See also 
 Culture of Vanuatu
 Mission (Christianity)

References

External links 
 Neil Thomas Ministries website

Methodism
Christian movements
Christian missions
Methodist organizations